Zhao Ji (–228 BC) was the wife of King Zhuangxiang of Qin and the mother of Qin Shi Huang, the first emperor of China. Upon her marriage, she was the Lady Zhao; after the king's death, she was the Queen Dowager.

The daughter of a prominent family of Zhao, she was a concubine of the merchant Lü Buwei, who gave her to his protégé, Prince Yiren of Qin. A year later, she gave birth to a son named Zheng; the historian Sima Qian, ill-disposed towards the first emperor, claimed that the pregnancy was especially long and that the child was actually Lü's. The couple were living at the time in Handan, the capital of Zhao, where Yiren was a hostage; when Qin laid siege to the city, Lü was able to bribe the prince's way out of town but Lady Zhao and her infant son were forced to hide among her family. Thanks to Lü's intervention and diplomacy, Prince Yiren subsequently ascended the Qin throne, becoming known to history by his posthumous name King Zhuangxiang.

When King Zhuangxiang died in 247 BC, Crown Prince Zheng ascended the throne and Lady Zhao became the Queen Dowager. Sima Qian claimed she continued her affair with Lü Buwei but, facing exposure and persecution, he gave her a man named Lao Ai disguised as a eunuch. The couple produced two illegitimate children. After Lao Ai was killed during an attempted coup d'état, the queen was imprisoned in her palace and the children were killed.

In 237 BC, a Qi man named Mao Jiao persuaded King Zheng to welcome the Queen Dowager back from Yong to Ganquan Palace in Xianyang, for fear that other regional states would turn against the Qin if they heard that King Zheng exiled his own mother.

By 221 BC, when King Zheng had unified China and become known as Shi Huangdi, the "First Emperor", the queen-dowager was already deceased. She was posthumously promoted as Empress Dowager. She was buried with King Zhuangxiang at Zhiyang.

Popular culture
In the manga and anime Kingdom, she was described and introduced as a beautiful dancing girl and Lu Buwei's lover, before she was engaged to Zhuangxiang. After getting stranded in Handan and giving birth to Zheng, she was cold to her son, to the point of sadism. She escaped after her son and joined the court as a dowager. She knew Lao Ai due to Lu's schemes and had children with him. In the aftermath of her attempt at a coup, she was imprisoned and her children with Lao Ai were secretly banished instead of killed.

She is portrayed by Wu Jinyan in the Chinese television series The Legend of Haolan (2019) and by Zhu Zhu in the series Qin Dynasty Epic.

Footnotes

References

3rd-century BC Chinese people
3rd-century BC Chinese women
280s BC births
228 BC deaths
Qin royal consorts
Qin Shi Huang